William Henry Nash (22 June 1882 – 15 June 1962) was an Australian rules footballer who played with St Kilda in the Victorian Football League (VFL).

References

External links 

1882 births
1962 deaths
Australian rules footballers from Melbourne
St Kilda Football Club players
People from North Melbourne